Big City Greens is an American animated comedy adventure television series created by the Houghton brothers that premiered on Disney Channel on June 18, 2018. The series features the voices of Chris Houghton, Marieve Herington, Bob Joles, and Artemis Pebdani.

Series overview

Episodes

Season 1 (2018–19)

Season 2 (2019–21)

Season 3 (2021–23)

Shorts
Disney Channel has released several shorts connected with the series on their YouTube channel. These include seven Country Kids in the City shorts, twenty-nine Random Rings shorts, seven Road Trip shorts, nine Miss Tilly's Fun Time TV Minute shorts, and several standalone shorts.

Country Kids in the City (2018) 
These shorts primarily focus on Cricket and Tilly and are no longer than a minute in length.

Random Rings (2019–23) 
These shorts feature prank calls by Cricket, and occasionally others, which have been set to Adobe Flash animation. The series began crossing over with other Disney Channel shows.

Big City Greens: Road Trip (2019) 
Tilly wins free tickets to Breakfast Land, a food themed amusement park, and the family go on a long aggravating road trip. While the shorts were released separately on television, they were compiled together online.

Miss Tilly's Fun Time TV Minute (2020)
Based on the episode "Dream Weaver", Tilly hosts her talk show by interviewing Disney Channel stars. As stated in the Ariel Martin episode and in between commercials promoting Big City Greens "back-to-back" weeknights for the month of May, these take place within Tilly's dreams and are considered "not canon" with the rest of the series.

Chibi Tiny Tales (2020)
Disney began releasing new shorts in the Chibi Tiny Tales series, itself loosely based on the Big Chibi 6 The Shorts series. The first one premiered at the end of the special Big City Greens: Shortsgiving which depicted the Greens hosting a shorts compilation show for Thanksgiving, including those from fellow shows Amphibia, The Owl House and Phineas and Ferb. A second shorts compilation special, titled Shortstober, aired on Disney Channel and was released on YouTube on October 23, 2021. A third shorts compilation special, titled Shortsmas, premiered on December 3, 2022.

Broken Karaoke (2019–)
An infrequent series that has the Green family singing parodies of existing songs.

Disney Theme Song Takeover (2019-2022)

Standalone shorts (2020–2022)

Notes

References 

Lists of American children's animated television series episodes
Lists of American comedy television series episodes
Lists of Disney Channel television series episodes